Cư Prao is a commune (xã) in M'Drăk District, Đắk Lắk Province, Vietnam. It contains 14 villages and hamlets. Hnang Hydropower has invested in water development in the commune.

References

Communes of Đắk Lắk province
Populated places in Đắk Lắk province